Quinton de Kock (born 17 December 1992) is a South African cricketer and former captain of the Proteas in all three formats. He currently plays for South Africa in limited overs cricket, Titans at the domestic level,  and Lucknow Super Giants in the Indian Premier League. He was named the Cricketer of the Year at Cricket South Africa's 2017 Annual Awards.

An opening batsman and wicket-keeper, de Kock made his domestic debut for the Highveld Lions during the 2012/2013 season. He quickly caught the national selectors' eye when he starred in a match-winning partnership with Neil McKenzie in the Champions League T20 against the Mumbai Indians in the Indian Premier League (IPL). He also finished fourth on the first-class rankings, despite playing only six of the 10 matches that summer.

De Kock made his international debut in the first match of South Africa's home Twenty20 International series against the touring New Zealanders during the 2012/13 season. He was asked to keep wickets in place of AB de Villiers, who asked to be rested. He has since played regularly for the team at both One Day International (ODI) and Twenty20 International (T20I) level. In February 2014, he also made his Test debut for South Africa, playing solely as a batsman.

By his 20th ODI match, De Kock had already scored five centuries. He became the fourth player to score three successive one-day centuries and the second player to score four ODI centuries before his 21st birthday. In his 74th ODI, against Sri Lanka on 10 February 2017, he became the fastest player to complete 12 ODI hundreds, bettering Hashim Amla, who had achieved the landmark in 81 innings.

Before joining the Titans in 2015, de Kock played domestic cricket for Gauteng and the Highveld Lions. He has also played in the Indian Premier League (IPL) for Sunrisers Hyderabad, Delhi Daredevils, Royal Challengers Bangalore, and Mumbai Indians. Although he opens the batting in One Day International and T20 cricket, he primarily bats in the middle order in Test cricket. In July 2020, he was named South Africa's Men's Cricketer of the Year at Cricket South Africa's annual awards ceremony. In December 2020, in the series against Sri Lanka, de Kock captained South Africa for the first time in Test cricket.

Early career
De Kock attended King Edward VII School in Johannesburg. He was spotted as a schoolboy talent and used to play for the affiliate club Old Eds. In the 2012 ICC Under-19 Cricket World Cup, he scored 95 off 131 balls in South Africa's first match against Bangladesh, which the team won by 133 runs. In the second match against Namibia, he scored 126 off 106 balls, with South Africa winning again, by 209 runs. In the quarter-final match against England, de Kock scored only 7 runs, but performed well as wicket-keeper, recording five dismissals (two stumpings and three catches). Overall, de Kock scored 284 runs throughout the tournament, ranking fourth for the tournament.

Domestic and franchise career
From Johannesburg, De Kock debuted for Gauteng's senior team during the 2009–10 season, aged 16, and subsequently represented the national under-19 team at the 2012 Under-19 World Cup. In April 2021, he was named in Northerns' squad, ahead of the 2021–22 cricket season in South Africa.

In the 2013 domestic twenty20 tournament in South Africa, De Kock played several good knocks to take his team Highveld Lions to the final where they won, eventually becoming the season dalla champions. On 18 February 2013, in the same tournament against Cape Cobras he hit the second highest T20 score of 126 in South Africa. His knock of 126 is also the highest T20 score ever made by a wicketkeeper batsman in an innings (126).

In 2013 de Kock was bought by Indian Premier League franchise Sunrisers Hyderabad in the player auction, but failed to impress when he played. He signed for Delhi Daredevils for the 2014 tournament, going on to play for the side until 2017 and scoring a century in 2016. He was bought by Royal Challengers Bangalore in 2018 auction and played for Mumbai Indians in the 2019 season. He was the team's highest run scorer during their championship winning season. In 2021, he was drafted by Southern Brave for the inaugural season of The Hundred. He was second highest run scorer for Southern Brave, scoring 202 runs in 9 matches.

In the 2022 IPL auction, de Kock was bought by Lucknow Super Giants. He scored his second IPL century on 18 May 2022 against the Kolkata Knight riders, with 140 runs in 70 balls. In April 2022, he was bought by the Southern Brave for the 2022 season of The Hundred in England.

International career

ODI cricket
De Kock represented South Africa for the first time, at T20 level, on 21 December 2012 against New Zealand. While South Africa crushed New Zealand and got them all out for only 86, the hosts chased it down easily with 8 wickets still remaining. De Kock made an impression on his first appearance by scoring an unbeaten 28 off 23 while chasing. He also kept wicket and gloved two catches.
De Kock made his debut for the South African ODI side on 19 January 2013, against New Zealand at Boland Park Stadium, Paarl, South Africa. It was reported that he was training and grooming under veteran retired South African wicket-keeper batsman Mark Boucher ahead of the ODI series against New Zealand. He was promoted to the opening batting spot from his second match onwards with Graeme Smith in his debut series.

In November 2013, De Kock was selected in the first XI of South Africa against Pakistan in the United Arab Emirates, in place of Colin Ingram. De Kock scored a match winning 112 off 135 balls on a tough batting track in Abu Dhabi in the fourth ODI to reach his maiden ODI century. South Africa won the ODI series 4–1. They also played two T20 games against Pakistan. De Kock scored 48 not out in the first match while chasing and took them home. They won that T20 series too by 2–0.

On 5 December 2013, De Kock scored 135 against India at his home ground in Johannesburg. His innings guided the team to a 141-run victory over India and he was awarded his first-ever 'Man of the Match' award in One Day International cricket. He followed his performance with another successive ODI ton in the next match against the same team in Durban. He scored 106 runs making a record-breaking opening stand of 194 in Durban with teammate Hashim Amla who also scored a century in the same match. This performance awarded him another 'Man of the Match' award while they already won the series beating India by 134 runs. He again broke a century knock of 101 in the 3rd ODI which was later abandoned due to rain, but he became only the fifth person to achieve this feat of three consecutive centuries in One Day Internationals, after Zaheer Abbas, Saeed Anwar, Herschelle Gibbs and AB de Villiers. He also became the highest run-getter ever in a three-match bilateral ODI series, breaking the previous record of Martin Guptill. Meanwhile, he was awarded the 'Man of the Series'.

De Kock scored his 5th ODI century knock of 128 against Sri Lanka to record their first-ever ODI series win in Sri Lanka. He also scored his maiden test fifty in the series.

In the 3-match tour to Zimbabwe in August, 2014, De Kock eventually became the joint quickest batsman to reach 1000 runs in ODI cricket sharing the record with Viv Richards, Jonathan Trott and Kevin Pietersen. He reached the milestone in 21 innings. He was also awarded the 'Player of the Series' in that tournament where South Africa beat Zimbabwe 3–0.

For his performances in 2014, De Kock was named in the World ODI XI by ICC. He was also named as wicket keeper of the ODI XI in 2016 by ICC and Cricinfo.

In the ODI series against Bangladesh in 2017, De Kock along with Hashim Amla set the highest record ODI runstand for South Africa with an unbeaten partnership of 282 runs. This is also the highest-ever partnership in One-Day Internationals without losing any wickets. For his performances in 2017, he was named as wicket keeper of the World ODI XI by ICC.

In April 2019, he was named in South Africa's squad for the 2019 Cricket World Cup. The International Cricket Council (ICC) named de Kock as the key player of South Africa's squad for the tournament. In the opening match of the World Cup against England, he scored 68. He ultimately finished with 305 runs from 8 matches, including three half centuries.

On 4 February 2020, during the home ODI series against England De Kock scored his 15th ODI century and became joint second fastest South African to reach 5,000 ODI runs. In the same match he also became only the second wicket keeper opening batsman after Adam Gilchrist while captaining the side to score a century in ODIs.

Test cricket
In February 2014, de Kock made his Test debut for South Africa, scoring seven runs in the first innings and 34 runs in the second innings against Australia at St George's Oval in Port Elizabeth.

In January 2016, when South Africa was losing the home Test series against England, De Kock was recalled to the Test side for the second Test, taking the keeper's gloves from AB de Villiers, but failed to deliver. He was replaced by Dane Vilas at the 11th hour before the third Test, after a freak injury he picked up at home the afternoon before. He was again selected for the fourth and the final Test and scored his debut Test century with a score of 129 not out in the first innings coming to bat at number seven. In the tour, De Kock reached a milestone as the fastest to reach 10 ODI centuries. He completed his 10th century in his 55th match. In their 3rd test against Pakistan he made his same score of 129 in their 2nd innings in 2019.

On 22 July 2018 during the second test match against Sri Lanka, he went on to become the fastest wicketkeeper in terms of matches (35) to take 150 test dismissals. On 27 January 2019 during the fourth test match against England, he broke the record for the fastest wicketkeeper to effect 200 dismissals (47).

On 12 June 2021, Quinton de Kock joined Mark Boucher in  3,000 runs in Test cricket as a wicketkeeper for South Africa club during his career-best 141 not-out against West Indies.

On 30 December 2021, De Kock announced his retirement from Test cricket.

T20I cricket
In March 2014, South Africa played a 3-match Twenty20 series against Australia. De Kock was named the 'Player of the Series' in the tournament although South Africa lost the series by 0–2. In 2019–2020 season de Kock was brilliant in this format scoring 4 half centuries. In September 2021, De Kock was named in South Africa's squad for the 2021 ICC Men's T20 World Cup.

In October 2021, during the Men's T20 World Cup, de Kock made himself unavailable for South Africa's match against West Indies after refusing to take the knee. Following the match, he apologised saying he would take the knee and wanted to play for his country again. De Kock explained that he had originally decided not to take the knee because of the way in which Cricket South Africa had handled the issue by mandating that all players take the knee shortly before the match against the West Indies. However, he returned to the side for South Africa's next match, against Sri Lanka, and took the knee before the start of play.

Personal life
De Kock married his girlfriend, Sasha Hurly, in September 2016. They have a daughter, born in January 2022.

Records and achievements
Milestones
 Fastest South African to reach 1,000 ODI runs.
Fastest wicketkeeper, in terms of matches (35), to make 150 Test dismissals.
Fastest wicket-keeper, in terms of matches, to complete 200 dismissals in Tests (47) beating the previous record held by Adam Gilchrist.
Fastest South African to score a T20I half century (17 balls).

References

External links
 
 Quinton de Kock's profile page on Wisden

1992 births
Living people
Cricketers from Johannesburg
White South African people
South Africa Test cricketers
South Africa One Day International cricketers
South Africa Twenty20 International cricketers
Cricketers at the 2015 Cricket World Cup
Cricketers at the 2019 Cricket World Cup
Gauteng cricketers
Lions cricketers
Sunrisers Hyderabad cricketers
Delhi Capitals cricketers
Easterns cricketers
Titans cricketers
Royal Challengers Bangalore cricketers
Cape Town Blitz cricketers
Mumbai Indians cricketers
Southern Brave cricketers
Northerns cricketers
Lucknow Super Giants cricketers
Barbados Royals cricketers
Durban's Super Giants cricketers
Wicket-keepers